Somerset County Courthouse can refer to:

 Somerset County Courthouse (Maine)
 Somerset County Courthouse (New Jersey)
 Somerset County Courthouse (Pennsylvania)